Cynodontium is a genus of mosses belonging to the family Dicranaceae.

Species:
 Cynodontium alpestre (Wahlenb.) Milde
 Cynodontium asperifolium (Lindb. ex Arnell) Paris
 Cynodontium bogotense Hampe

References

Dicranales
Moss genera